Captive is a 2012 French-Filipino psychological drama-thriller film directed by Brillante Mendoza and starring Isabelle Huppert. The film was screened in competition at the 62nd Berlin International Film Festival in February 2012.

The plot focuses on describing the torturous life of the hostages of the Dos Palmas kidnappings, whose survivors were freed after a year in captivity.

Cast
 Isabelle Huppert as Thérèse Bourgoine
 Marc Zanetta as John Bernstein
 Katherine Mulville as Sophie Bernstein
 Maria Isabel Lopez as Marianne Agudo Pineda
 Mercedes Cabral as Emma Policarpio
 Sid Lucero as Abu Mokhif
 Kristoffer King as Jairulle
 Ronnie Lazaro as Abu Azali
 Mon Confiado as Abu Omar
 Raymond Bagatsing as Abu Saiyed
 Angel Aquino as Olive Reyes
 Bernard Palanca as Santi Dizon
 Allan Paule as Fred Siazon
 Archie Adamos as Randy Bardone
 Jelyn Nataly Chong as Jessica Lim
 Nico Antonio as Arnulfo Reyes
 Coco Martin as Abusama
 Neil Ryan Sese as Molazem
 Rustica Carpio as Soledad
 Che Ramos as Joan Corpuz

Production
Coco Martin was supposed to have a lead role opposite the film's star Isabelle Huppert. Martin was supposed to play a Marine but had to drop out and settle for a cameo role due to conflicts with his taping schedule for the military fiction Minsan Lang Kita Iibigin.

References

External links
 

2012 films
2012 drama films
2010s psychological drama films
Philippine films based on actual events
French drama films
2010s French-language films
Films directed by Brillante Mendoza
Star Cinema films
Star Cinema drama films
Philippine psychological drama films
Philippine psychological thriller films
2010s French films